Donoghue or O'Donoghue is an anglicized form of the Irish language surname Ó Donnchadha or Ó Donnchú.

Etymology
The name means "descendant of Donnchadh", a personal name composed of the elements donn "brown-haired [man]" and cath "battle". Spelling variations (which include an initial "Ó" or omit it) include Donoghue, Donaghue, Donaghoe, Donoughe, Donaho, Donahoe, Donough, Donahue, Donahow, Doneghoe, Donehue, Donighue, Donihue, Donoho, Donohoe, Donahugh, Donohough, Donohow, Donohue, Donaughue, Donaghie, Donaghy, Doughue, Dougue, Donihoo and many more. Some of these variations exist also in Northern Ireland and Scotland with the same meaning in Scottish Gaelic as in Irish.

Different septs
There are several completely different O'Donoghue families in Ireland.

(1) The Ó Donnchadha of Cashel, from the Eóganacht Chaisil, related to the O'Sullivans, MacCarthys and O'Callaghans. They descend from Donnchad mac Cellacháin, King of Munster.
(2) The Ó Donnchadha of Desmond, from the Eóganacht Raithlind, related to the O'Mahonys, prominent in County Kerry and referred to as "O'Donoghue Mór." They descend from Donnchadh mac Domhnall.
(3) The Ó Donnchadha of Osraige, from the Clann Conla, related to the Mac Giolla Phádraig dynasty ("the Fitzpatricks") and produced some kings of Osraige, prominent in County Kilkenny and commonly anglicised as Dunphy. They descend from Donnchad mac Gilla Pátraic.
(4) The Ó Donnchadha of Uí Maine, from the Uí Maine, related to the O'Kellys, prominent in County Galway and County Roscommon.

People with the surname O'Donoghue

Bernard O'Donoghue, Irish poet and academic
Charles Henry O'Donoghue, zoologist
Daniel O'Donoghue, Irish politician
Daniel John O'Donoghue, Ontario labour leader and political figure
David James O'Donoghue, Journalist and Author
Florence O'Donoghue, Irish historian and intelligence specialist
Gary O'Donoghue, BBC journalist
Geoffrey Paul Vincent O'Donoghue of the Glens
John O'Donoghue (politician), Irish Fianna Fáil politician, former cabinet minister and former Ceann Comhairle
Juan O'Donojú, Spanish military officer and last viceroy of New Spain
General Sir Kevin O'Donoghue KCB CBE, the first Chief of Defence Materiel in the United Kingdom Ministry of Defence
Kevin O'Donoghue, Artist Educator at Clonkeen College
Brian O'Donoghue, former GAA Goalkeepers
Martin O'Donoghue, Irish economist and [ (shouldn't these lists of names be alphabetized?)[Fianna Fáil]] politician
Patrick O'Donoghue, Irish-born current bishop emeritus of the Roman Catholic Diocese of Lancaster, England
Peter O'Donoghue (disambiguation), multiple people
Enda O'Donoghue (visual artist)

In entertainment, sports, activism
Ben O'Donoghue, Australian celebrity chef
Colin O'Donoghue, Irish actor currently acting at Once Upon A Time
Danny O'Donoghue, lead singer of the Irish band "The Script"
Ed O'Donoghue, Irish rugby union player
John E. O'Donoghue, Major League Baseball pitcher
John P. O'Donoghue, Major League Baseball pitcher
Lowitja O'Donoghue, Aboriginal Australian civil and political rights activist
Michael O'Donoghue, Irish-American comedian, writer and occasional performer for Saturday Night Live
Nan Joyce née O'Donoghue, Irish Travellers' right activist
Neil O'Donoghue, former NFL kicker

See also

 The Scottish Clan Robertson, anciently known as Clann Dhonnchaidh, 'Children of Donnchadh' is of separate origin, though of the same elemental meaning in Scots Gaelic.
 Donoghue (disambiguation)
 O'Donohue
 Donahoe
 Donohue
 Donohoe
 Donahue
 Donough
 Irish nobility
 Ross Castle

Other Munster families

 O'Mahony
 O'Donovan
 McGillycuddy of the Reeks and/or O'Sullivan Mor
 O'Callaghan
 O'Brien, Prince of Thomond
 O'Grady of Kilballyowen

References

 Byrne, Francis J., Irish Kings and High-Kings. Four Courts Press. 2nd edition, 2001.
 Curley, Walter J.P., Vanishing Kingdoms: The Irish Chiefs and their Families. Dublin: Lilliput Press. 2004.
 MacLysaght, Edward, Irish Families: Their Names, Arms and Origins. Irish Academic Press. 4th edition, 1998.

External links
 The O'Donoghue Society
Ó Donnchadha at Library Ireland

Surnames
Ancient Irish dynasties
Anglicised Irish-language surnames